Iridopelma is a genus of Brazilian tarantulas that was first described by Reginald Innes Pocock in 1901.

Diagnosis
Males of this genus can be distinguished by the tibial spurs on leg 1 and 2, while females differ from most other genera by the anterior eye row, which is strongly curved forward. Avicularia and Typhochlaena both own the latter characteristics; however, Iridopelma can be distinguished from Avicularia by the spermatheca, which lacks a curvature, and from Typhochlaena by the spinnerets, which are finger-shaped.

Species
 it contains six species, all found in Brazil:
Iridopelma hirsutum Pocock, 1901 (type) – Brazil
Iridopelma katiae Bertani, 2012 – Brazil
Iridopelma marcoi Bertani, 2012 – Brazil
Iridopelma oliveirai Bertani, 2012 – Brazil
Iridopelma vanini Bertani, 2012 – Brazil
Iridopelma zorodes (Mello-Leitão, 1926) – Brazil

In synonymy
I. palmicola (Mello-Leitão, 1945) = Iridopelma hirsutum

Nomina dubia
 Iridopelma leporina (C. L. Koch, 1841) - Brazil
 Iridopelma plantaris (C. L. Koch, 1842) - Brazil

Transferred to other genera
 Iridopelma seladonium (C. L. Koch, 1841) → Typhochlaena seladonia

See also
 List of Theraphosidae species

References

Theraphosidae genera
Spiders of Brazil
Taxa named by R. I. Pocock
Theraphosidae